DWRC (95.5 FM), broadcasting as Sigaw 95.5 Music & News FM, is a radio station owned and operated by Filipinas Broadcasting Network. Its studio and transmitter are located along Capt. F. Aquende Dr., Legazpi, Albay.

References

Radio stations in Legazpi, Albay
DWRC